Ilse Geisler (later Vorsprach and since divorced, born 10 January 1941) is an East German luger who competed from the late 1950s to the mid-1960s. She won the silver medal in the women's singles event at the 1964 Winter Olympics in Innsbruck.

She was born in Kunnersdorf. Geisler also won three medals in the women's singles event at the FIL World Luge Championships with two golds (1962, 1963) and one bronze (1965).

References
 
 
 
 Kluge, Volker. (2000). Das große Lexikon der DDR-Sportler. Berlin: Schwarzkopf & Schwarzkopf. 
  

1941 births
Living people
German female lugers
Lugers at the 1964 Winter Olympics
Olympic silver medalists for the United Team of Germany
Olympic lugers of the United Team of Germany
Olympic medalists in luge
Medalists at the 1964 Winter Olympics
Recipients of the Patriotic Order of Merit